A Carolina Jubilee is the second studio album by North Carolina folk rock band The Avett Brothers after self-releasing their self titled debut EP and live album Live at the Double Door Inn. The album was released on August 19, 2003 on the Ramseur Records label. The album is described as mixing bluegrass and modern rock in the vein of early Uncle Tupelo and The Gourds.

Track listing

Bonus EP 

Initial purchases of A Carolina Jubilee were accompanied by a limited-edition EP.

 "In the Curve"
 "Tale of Coming News"

Personnel
All songs written and performed by The Avett Brothers:
Scott Avett - vocals, banjo and percussion
Seth Avett - vocals, guitar, piano, kazoo and percussion
Bob Crawford - double bass and vocals

 Additional musicians
Eric Lovell - mandolin, pedal steel and dobro
Patrick Gauthier - extra background vocals
Dave Rhames - additional vocals on "Love Like The Movies"
Jim Avett - dialog on "Carolina Jubilee (August 15, 1985)"

References 

The Avett Brothers albums
2003 albums